Boesch is a surname. Notable people with the name include:

 Brennan Boesch (born 1985), American professional baseball player
 Christian Boesch (born 1941), Austrian operatic baritone
 Christophe Boesch (born 1951), Swiss-French primatologist
 Florian Boesch (born 1971),  Austrian bass-baritone
 Garth Boesch (1920–1998), Canadian professional hockey player
 Paul Boesch (1912–1989), American professional wrestling promoter
 Rudy Boesch (1928–2019), American retired Navy SEAL and reality show contestant
 Ruthilde Boesch (1918–2012), Austrian soprano

See also 
 Bosch (surname)
 Bösch